Tatlong Bibe is a 2017 independent comedy-drama film written and directed by Joven Tan. It stars Eddie Garcia, Dionisia Pacquiao, Lyca Gairanod, Raikko Mateo and Marco Masa. It is the first ever film of Gairanod and Juan Karlos Labajo.

Synopsis
A story about love and hope, and of giving, sharing, and forgiving.

Cast
 Lyca Gairanod as Kimberly
 Marco Masa as Noah
 Raikko Mateo as Toto
 Dionisia Pacquiao as Caring
 Angel Aquino as Olive
 Eddie Garcia as Delfin
 Rita Avila as Viring
 Victor Neri as Amado
 Ronnie Lazaro
 Edgar Allan Guzman as Elmo
 Anita Linda as Mameng
 Sharlene San Pedro as Liberty
 Juan Karlos Labajo as James
 Adrian Alandy as Art
 Perla Bautista as Auring
 Lou Veloso as Tino
 Nikki Valdez
 Dianne Medina
 Janna Trias
 Ernie Garcia

Release
The film was released theatrically on March 1, 2017, under Regis Films & Entertainment.

Reception
Oggz Cruz of Rappler wrote:

References

External links
 

Philippine drama films
Philippine comedy-drama films
Philippine independent films
Films directed by Joven Tan